The 1982 United States Senate election in Delaware was held on November 2, 1982. Incumbent Republican U.S. Senator William V. Roth won reelection to a third term.

Major candidates

Democratic 
David N. Levinson, Insurance Commissioner of Delaware

Republican 
William V. Roth, incumbent U.S. Senator

Results

See also 
 1982 United States Senate elections

References 

1982
Delaware
1982 Delaware elections